Dennis Condrey (born February 1, 1952) is an American retired professional wrestler. He is best known for his appearances with the Continental Wrestling Association, Jim Crockett Promotions and World Championship Wrestling in the 1970s and 1980s.

Professional wrestling career

National Wrestling Alliance (1973–1987)
Dennis Condrey was born in Florence, Alabama, and started wrestling in 1973 in the Tennessee area, wrestling for promoter Nick Gulas. He would also wrestle in the Mid-Atlantic area as well. In 1974, Condrey teamed up with Phil Hickerson, and became known as the Bicentennial Kings, and was managed by "Kangaroo" Al Costello. In March 1977, he began wrestling for Jerry Jarrett's promotion in Memphis. Four months later, he would make his first international trip to Canada, wrestling in the Maritimes. In 1978, Condrey went to Alabama's Southeast Championship Wrestling. After the Bicentennial Kings broke up in 1979, Condrey formed the Big C's with Don Carson. In 1980, after Carson retired, Condrey teamed up with Randy Rose, and formed the Midnight Express, alongside Norvell Austin. They left for Mid-South wrestling in 1984.

Once in Mid-South, Condrey formed a new version of the Midnight Express with Bobby Eaton with Jim Cornette as their manager. They also started a legendary feud with the Rock 'n' Roll Express that carried over into the NWA's Jim Crockett Promotions in 1985.

In early 1986, Condrey and Eaton won the NWA World Tag Team Titles from the Rock 'n' Roll Express on Superstars on the Superstation and feuded with them until Condrey left the promotion in early 1987. He left overnight giving no notice to Cornette, Eaton, or the NWA.

American Wrestling Association (1987)
Condrey would reunite with former partner Randy Rose in the AWA under manager Paul E. Dangerously. "Loverboy" Dennis and "Ravishing" Randy called themselves "The Midnight Express", and claimed the right to the name, which had since been used by Condrey and Eaton (and later by "Beautiful" Bobby Eaton and "Sweet" Stan Lane) in the NWA.

They would defeat Jerry Lawler and Bill Dundee for the AWA World Tag Team titles on October 30, 1987, in Whitewater, WI. They would have a two-month title reign, losing the titles to the returning Midnight Rockers (Shawn Michaels and Marty Jannetty) on December 27, 1987 in Las Vegas, Nevada.

Return to the NWA World Championship Wrestling (1988–1989)
After wrestling the independents, Condrey returned to the NWA in November 1988, alongside Randy Rose and Paul E. Dangerously, and now calling themselves "The Original Midnight Express".

During the November 5 episode of World Championship Wrestling, Jim Cornette received an anonymous phone call. The caller ridiculed Cornette over Eaton and Lane's loss of the NWA World Tag Team titles to the Road Warriors on October 29. Cornette recognized the caller and basically asked him to come say it to his face. At that point, Dangerously and the Original Midnight Express hit the ring and proceeded to pummel Cornette and Stan Lane, who was wrestling in a singles match. By the time Bobby Eaton showed up, it was three on one. Cornette showed up the next week on TBS carrying his blood stained suit jacket and the feud was on.

The teams wrestled at Starrcade '88, but nothing was solved. The Midnights vs. Midnights would be the hottest feud in the NWA for months, building up to a 6-man tag match involving the managers on pay-per-view in February 1989. The one who got pinned would have to leave the promotion. However, due to changes in ownership, the NWA was going through booking upheaval with Dusty Rhodes being replaced as head booker by George Scott. Jim Crockett, Jr. already had a problem with Condrey due to his previous overnight disappearance and Scott had previous animosity with Rose, so Scott's appearance as top booker made for the catalyst to bury both teams and the feud. The feud was cooled off and the "loser leaves town" match was going to be used to kick one of them out of the territory once and for all and continue to bury the other. At the last minute, Dennis Condrey once again decided to leave the NWA, rather than take his PPV payoff and give Crockett and Scott the satisfaction. Jack Victory was brought in as his replacement and the match went forward.

Continental Wrestling Federation and International Championship Wrestling (1989–1990)
Condrey returned to Alabama (now known as Continental) in the Spring of 1989. On July 22, 1989, Condrey defeated Tom Prichard to win the CWF Heavyweight Championship, before losing the title back to Prichard on December 6. He would also form a short-lived tag team called the "Lethal Weapons" with Doug Gilbert. Together, they went to the New England area to wrestle for International Championship Wrestling. On December 30, 1989, they defeated Phil Apollo and Vic Steamboat, who was subbing for Apollo's partner Eric Sbraccia, who no-showed, to win the ICW Tag Team Championship. They held onto the belts until March 1990, when they left the promotion. Condrey retired shortly thereafter.

Independent circuit (2004–2011)
Condrey came back to team with Eaton in 2004 and, along with Stan Lane, they have been wrestling as the Midnight Express in the independents and feuding with the Rock 'n' Roll Express and The Fantastics.

Condrey signed to World Wrestling Entertainment in March 2010 as a developmental trainer. He was assigned to Florida Championship Wrestling and works with the rookies on the NXT roster. Condrey retired in 2011, after wrestling his last match on October 15, against Bill Mulkey at the AWE Night of Legends.

Championships and accomplishments
American Wrestling Association
AWA World Tag Team Championship (1 time) – with Randy Rose
Continental Wrestling Federation
CWF Heavyweight Championship (1 time)
Georgia Championship Wrestling
NWA Georgia Heavyweight Championship (1 time)
International Championship Wrestling (New England)
ICW Tag Team Championship (1 time) – with Doug Gilbert
International Wrestling Cartel
IWC Tag Team Championship (1 time) – with Bobby Eaton
Jim Crockett Promotions
NWA World Tag Team Championship (Mid-Atlantic version) (1 time) – with Bobby Eaton
Memphis Wrestling Hall of Fame
Class of 2017
Mid-South Wrestling Association
Mid-South Tag Team Championship (2 times) – with Bobby Eaton
National Wrestling Alliance
NWA Hall of Fame (class of 2008)
NWA Bluegrass
NWA Bluegrass Tag Team Championship (1 time) – with Bobby Eaton
NWA Mid-America / Continental Wrestling Association
NWA Southern Tag Team Championship (9 times) – with Phil Hickerson (5), Don Carson (1), David Schultz (1), and Randy Rose (2)
NWA Mid-America Heavyweight Championship (2 times)
NWA Mid-America Tag Team Championship (1 time) – with Phil Hickerson
NWA Six-Man Tag Team Championship (2 times) - with Al Greene & Phil Hickerson (1), and Tojo Yamamoto & Chris Colt (1)
NWA United States Tag Team Championship (Mid-America version)  (5 times) – with Phil Hickerson
NWA World Brass Knuckles Championship (1 time)
NWA Wrestle Birmingham
NWA Wrestle Birmingham Heavyweight Championship (1 time)
NWA Wrestle Birmingham Television Championship (1 time)
Professional Wrestling Hall of Fame
Class of 2019 - Inducted as part of The Midnight Express with "Beautiful" Bobby Eaton and "Ravishing" Randy Rose
Southeastern Championship Wrestling
NWA Alabama Heavyweight Championship (2 times)
NWA Southeastern Heavyweight Championship (Northern Division) (1 time)
NWA Southeastern Tag Team Championship (15 times) – with Randy Rose (10), David Shultz (1), Don Carson (1), and Phil Hickerson (3)
Windy City Pro Wrestling
WCPW Tag Team Championship (1 time) - with Randy Rose
World Class Championship Wrestling
NWA American Tag Team Championship (1 time) – with Bobby Eaton
World Wrestling Council
WWC North American Tag Team Championship (1 time) – with Dutch Mantel
Pro Wrestling Illustrated
PWI ranked him # 219 of the 500 best singles wrestlers during the "PWI Years" in 2003.
PWI ranked him # 21 of the 100 best tag teams during the "PWI Years" with Bobby Eaton in 2003.
Wrestling Observer Newsletter awards
Tag Team of the Year (1986) with Bobby Eaton
Wrestling Observer Newsletter Hall of Fame (Class of 2009) with Bobby Eaton as the Midnight Express;

See also
 The Midnight Express

References

External links
 
 

1952 births
20th-century professional wrestlers
21st-century professional wrestlers
American male professional wrestlers
Living people
Sportspeople from Florence, Alabama
Professional wrestlers from Alabama
Professional Wrestling Hall of Fame and Museum
The Dangerous Alliance members
The First Family (professional wrestling) members
AWA World Tag Team Champions
WCW World Tag Team Champions
NWA Georgia Heavyweight Champions